The Seawane Club is a private member owned golf and country club in Hewlett Harbor, New York. It contains an 18 hole golf course, 8 tennis courts, 2 pickleball courts, a basketball court, a swimming pool, a bar, restaurant, grill room, men's and women's card room, men's and women's locker rooms, masseur complete health club facilities with trainers and barbershop.  In 2004, it was awarded the New York Sports Writers Association Golf Club of the year.

The club is located at 1300 Club Drive in Hewlett Harbor in Nassau County, Long Island, New York.  It is on the south shore and borders an inlet of Hewlett Bay. The club's name originates from the word "sewan," beads used as wampum by American Indians.

References

External links
Seawane Club

Golf clubs and courses in New York (state)
Golf clubs and courses designed by Devereux Emmet
Clubs and societies in the United States
Sports venues in Hempstead, New York
Sports venues in Long Island
Sports venues in Nassau County, New York
1927 establishments in New York (state)